Diploosmeteriosepsis is a genus of flies in the family Sepsidae.

Species
Diploosmeteriosepsis pilifemur (Munari, 1994)

References

Sepsidae
Diptera of Africa
Brachycera genera